Dimili is a village in  Rambilli mandal of Anakapalli district, Andhra Pradesh, India, nearly 60 km from Visakhapatnam city.

Demographics
According to Indian census, 2001, the demographic details of this village is as follows:
 Total Population: 	4,100 in 1,035 Households.
 Male Population: 	2,048
 Female Population: 	2,052
 Children Under 6-years: 	506 (Boys - 236 and Girls - 270)
 Total Literates: 	2,143

References

External links
 "Rain causes extensive damage", The Hindu. 3 November 2010.

Villages in Anakapalli district